Plasmodium wenyoni is a parasite of the genus Plasmodium. As in all Plasmodium species, P. wenyoni has both vertebrate and insect hosts. The vertebrate hosts for this parasite are reptiles.

Taxonomy 
The parasite was first described by Garnham in 1965. The original host was a Thamnodynastes pallidus that died in a London zoo in 1934.

Distribution 
This species is found in Brazil.

Hosts 
The only known hosts of this species are snakes. 

The insect vectors for this species are mosquitoes of the genus Culex.

Fever in the infected snake is irregular.

References 

wenyoni